Newsham Abbey was an abbey in Newsham, a small hamlet north of Brocklesby village in Lincolnshire, England. Founded by Peter of Gousla in 1143, Newsham was a daughter house of the Abbey of Licques, near Calais, and the first Premonstratensian house established in England.

History
Founded in 1143, the Abbey of St. Mary and St. Martial at Newsham (or Newhouse) was the first Premonstratensian house established in England.

Foundation
It was founded by Peter of Gousla, who held in Newsham one knight's fee of Ralf de Bayeux, with the consent of his lord. It was populated with a colony from Liegues Abbey, near Calais, France, then under the rule of Abbot Henry. On their arrival in England the White Canons were hospitably received by William, Earl of Lincoln, who confirmed the donations made to Gelro, the first Abbot of Newhouse, by Peter of Goxhill, by Ralph de Halton, and Geoffrey de Tours. William de Romara, earl of Lincoln, and Elias d'Albini were also benefactors of the monastery.

Bishop Alexander of Lincoln and his successor, Robert de Chesney, issued confirmation charters and took the new monastery into their protection.

The abbey was a daughter house of the abbey of Lisques, near Calais, and was parent of eleven others, including Barlings, Tupholme, and Newbo.

In 1385 the canons complained of poverty and heavy burdens of hospitality, and recent storms had almost reduced the monastic buildings to ruins.

In 1472 the abbot was censured for not providing an abbot for the daughterhouse of Alnwick.

Abbots

The names of twenty-six abbots of Newsham are known, the last being Thomas Harpham, who was abbot from 1534 to the suppression of the abbey by Henry VIII.

Gerlo, (fn. 33) first abbot, 1143-60

Amblardus, (fn. 34) occurs 1177

David, (fn. 35) occurs 1177-83

Gervase (fn. 36)

Adam, (fn. 37) occurs 1199

Lambert, (fn. 38) occurs 1200-03

Walter (fn. 39)

Geoffrey, (fn. 40) occurs 1219

Osbert, (fn. 41) occurs 1226-30

Thomas, (fn. 42) occurs 1242-75

John de Cave, (fn. 43) occurs 1278-94

Thomas de Hedon, (fn. 44) elected 1296, occurs to 1310

Ralf, (fn. 45) occurs 1327

Alan, (fn. 46) elected 1334, occurs to 1354

Robert of Thornton, (fn. 47) elected 1355

William of Teleby, (fn. 48) occurs 1377-83

Hugh, (fn. 49) occurs 1395-1419

Henry of Limber, (fn. 50) elected 1420, occurs to 1435

Robert, (fn. 51) occurs 1446-62

Thomas Ashton, (fn. 52) occurs 1475, resigned 1478

John Swift, (fn. 53) elected 1478, resigned 1497

William Sawndalle, (fn. 54) elected 1497, occurs to 1503

Thomas, (fn. 55) resigned after 1503

John Max, (fn. 56) occurs 1518

Christopher Lord, (fn. 57) occurs 1522 and 1529, died 1534

Thomas Doncaster or Harpham, (fn. 58) last abbot, elected 1534

Spread of the Order
In the Middle Ages, Lincolnshire was one of the most densely populated parts of England. Within the county there were no less than nine  Premonstratensian houses. Other than Newsham Abbey, these were:  Barlings Abbey, Broadholme Priory (women), Cammeringham Priory, Hagnaby Abbey, Newbo Abbey, Orford Priory (women), Stixwould Priory, Tupholme Abbey and  West Ravendale Priory.
Beyond Lincolnshire, Newhouse had an important role, in time becoming the mother-house of eleven of the Premonstratensian houses throughout  England. Between 1147 and 1200 some 100 canons left Newsham to colonise new houses in England. The following list gives in alphabetical order the names and dates of foundations of the Premonstratensian (Norbertine) abbeys, made from the Abbey of Newhouse and existing in England at the time of the Reformation:

Alnwick Abbey, Northumberland, this was the first foundation made from Newhouse (1147); 
Barlings Abbey, near Lincoln (1154); 
Beeleigh Abbey (Bileigh Abbey, once Maldon Abbey), near Maldon, Essex (1180); 
Coverham Abbey, North Yorkshire (originally established at Swainby, 1190); 
Croxton Abbey, near Melton Mowbray, Leicestershire (1163); 
Dale (Stanley Park) Abbey, Derbyshire (1204); 
Easby Abbey (Abbey of St Agatha) at Easby, near Richmond, Yorkshire (1152);
Newbo Abbey, near Sedgebrook, Lincolnshire (1198); 
Sulby Abbey, Northamptonshire (originally established at Welford) (1155).

Burials
Philip le Despencer, 1st Baron le Despencer and wife Elizabeth Spencer Despencer
Joan Cobham, mother of Philip le Despencer, 1st Baron le Despencer (daughter of John de Cobham, 2nd Baron Cobham (of Kent))
Sir Henry Wentworth

Suppression
It was suppressed in 1536, and the site was incorporated into a landscape park by Capability Brown during the 18th century. Parts of the abbey including the precinct boundary are visible as earthworks, and there is a heavy scatter of building material, and grassed-over foundations.

References

Attribution
 The entry cites:
William Dugdale, Monasticon Anglicanum, VI; 
Collectanea Anglo-Præmonst, in Redmen, Register, ed. Francis Aidan Gasquet (Royal Historical Society, 3rd series, VI, X, XII);
Geudens, A Sketch of the Premonstratensian Order and its houses in Great Britain and Ireland (London, 1878); 
Hugo, Annales Præmonstratenses (Nancy, 1734).

Monasteries in Lincolnshire
Premonstratensian monasteries in England
1143 establishments in England
1530s disestablishments in England
Christian monasteries established in the 12th century